Princess Irene of Greece and Denmark (13 February 1904 – 15 April 1974) was the fifth child and second daughter of Constantine I of Greece and his wife, the former Princess Sophie of Prussia. She was a member of the royal families of Greece and Italy. From 1941 to 1943, she was also officially Queen Consort of Croatia.

Family and early life

Irene was born on 13 February 1904 in Athens. She had three elder brothers, Alexander (1893) George (1890), and Paul (1901), and one elder sister, Helen (1896). Another sister, Katherine was born in 1913. In 1927, her brother, George, announced her engagement to Prince Christian of Schaumburg-Lippe, a nephew of Christian X of Denmark, but no marriage occurred.

Irene’s paternal grandparents were George I of Greece and Olga Konstantinovna of Russia. Her maternal grandparents were Friedrich III, German Emperor, and his Empress consort Victoria. Victoria was a daughter of Prince Albert of Saxe-Coburg and Gotha and Queen Victoria of the United Kingdom.

Marriage
On 1 July 1939, Irene married Prince Aimone, 4th Duke of Aosta (9 March 1900 – 29 January 1948). They had one child:

 Prince Amedeo, 5th Duke of Aosta (27 September 1943 – 1 June 2021)

In March 1942, Irene, who was a trained nurse, headed a Red Cross hospital train going to Russia to repatriate wounded Italian soldiers.  After a difficult journey, she returned to Florence the following month. Prince Aimone became the 4th Duke of Aosta on 3 March 1942, following the death of his elder brother, Amedeo. On 18 May 1941, taking the name Tomislav II, he was proclaimed King of the Independent State of Croatia, a puppet state of fascist Germany and Italy, but he never set foot on the territory of the state and abdicated in 1943.

After the Allied armistice with the Kingdom of Italy, Irene was interned by the Germans at the Hotel Ifen in Hirschegg, Austria, July 1944, along with her infant son, her sister-in-law and two nieces. They were liberated by the French in May 1945.

After the war and the 1946 plebiscite which ended the monarchy in Italy, the family went into exile.  Prince Aimone died on 29 January 1948 in Buenos Aires. Upon his death, his son Amedeo succeeded him as the 5th Duke of Aosta.  In June 1948, the family was allowed to return to Italy, and Irene spent the rest of her life living outside of Florence.

Irene died on 15 April 1974 in Fiesole, Italy, after fighting a long illness.

Ancestry

References
Edward Hanson, The Wandering Princess: Princess Helene of France, Duchess of Aosta (1871-1951) [Fonthill, 2017].

1904 births
1974 deaths
Nobility from Athens
Irene
Irene
Greek princesses
Danish princesses
Italian princesses
Italian people of Greek descent
Italian people of Danish descent
Princesses della Cisterna
Burials at the Basilica of Superga
Daughters of kings